Demuryne is an urban-type settlement in Synelnykove Raion of Dnipropetrovsk Oblast in Ukraine. Demuryne belongs to Mezhova settlement hromada, one of the hromadas of Ukraine. Population: 

Until 18 July 2020, Demuryne belonged to Mezhova Raion. The raion was abolished in July 2020 as part of the administrative reform of Ukraine, which reduced the number of raions of Dnipropetrovsk Oblast to seven. The area of Mezhova Raion was merged into Synelnykove Raion.

Economy

Transportation
Demuryne railway station is on the railway connecting Synelnykove with Pokrovsk. There is regular local passenger traffic.

The settlement is on Highway H15 which connects Zaporizhia and Donetsk which is only operational until Marinka since Donetsk is controlled by the separatist forces of the Donetsk People's Republic. Demuryne is also connected by road with Pokrovsk via Mezhova.

References

Urban-type settlements in Synelnykove Raion